Gregor Fučka (born 7 August 1971) is a Slovenian-Italian retired professional basketball player and coach. A 215 cm (7' ") forward-center, he was a both a Mister Europa and Euroscar laureate in 2000.

Professional career 
Fučka played with Smelt Olimpija, in Yugoslavia, from 1988–90, then he moved to Italy, playing with Stefanel Trieste (1990–1994), Stefanel Milano (1994–1997), and Teamsystem Bologna a.k.a. Paf Wennington Bologna a.k.a. Skipper Bologna (1997–2002). Then he played in Spain, with FC Barcelona (2002–2006), and with Akasvayu Girona (2006–07). He then came back to Italy, in the 2007–08 season, playing with Lottomatica Roma.

National team career 
Fučka played with Italy's junior national team at the 1991 FIBA Under-19 World Cup, where he won the silver medal. He also played at the FIBA Under-21 World Cup with Italy's junior national team, in 1993.

With the senior men's Italian national basketball team, Fučka played at the 2000 Summer Olympic Games, and he won the gold medal at the FIBA EuroBasket 1999, where he was named the tournament's MVP. Fučka also won a silver medal at the FIBA EuroBasket 1997. He also played at the 1998 FIBA World Championship (selected to the All-Tournament Team), and at the FIBA EuroBasket 1995 and the FIBA EuroBasket 2001.

References

External links
 Euroleague.net Profile
 FIBA Europe Profile
 Italian League Profile  
 Spanish League Profile 
 Gregor Fučka at Basket-stats.info
 Gregor Fucka, not your typical star

1971 births
Living people
1998 FIBA World Championship players
Basketball players at the 2000 Summer Olympics
CB Girona players
Centers (basketball)
Euroscar award winners
FIBA EuroBasket-winning players
FC Barcelona Bàsquet players
Fortitudo Pallacanestro Bologna players
Italian basketball coaches
Italian expatriate basketball people in Spain
Italian men's basketball players
KK Olimpija players
Liga ACB players
Naturalised citizens of Italy
Olimpia Milano players
Olympic basketball players of Italy
Pallacanestro Virtus Roma players
Pallacanestro Trieste players
Pistoia Basket 2000 players
Power forwards (basketball)
Slovenian basketball coaches
Slovenian emigrants to Italy
Slovenian expatriate basketball people in Italy
Slovenian expatriate basketball people in Spain
Slovenian men's basketball players
Sportspeople from Kranj